José Antonio López Gil (born 11 July 1976 in San Pedro de Alcántara) is a Spanish former road racing cyclist.

Palmarès
2002
1st Clásica Ciudad de Torredonjimeno
2003
1st stage 7 Vuelta a Cuba
2004
2nd Memorial Manuel Galera
2008
1st stage 1 Vuelta a Andalucía

References

1976 births
Living people
Spanish male cyclists
Sportspeople from the Province of Málaga
Cyclists from Andalusia